Agon Sadiku (born 10 March 2003) is a Finnish professional footballer who plays as a centre-forward for Veikkausliiga club Honka. A former youth international for Finland, he played for the Kosovo national team in a pair of friendlies before switching back to play for the Finland national team.

Club career

HJK
On 29 November 2019, Sadiku signed a first-team contract with Veikkausliiga club HJK. On 27 June 2020, Sadiku made his debut with HJK's reserve team in a league match against TPV after coming on as a substitute at 74th minute in place of Arttu Eerola.

Honka
On 31 December 2021, Sadiku joined Veikkausliiga side Honka. His debut with Honka came on 8 February 2022 in the 2022 Finnish League Cup group stage against Haka after being named in the starting line-up. Four days after debut, Sadiku scored his first goal for Honka in his second appearance for the club in a 4–0 away win over Lahti in Finnish League Cup.

International career

Finland
From 2020, until 2022, Sadiku has been part of Finland at youth international level, respectively has been part of the U17, U19, U20 and U21 teams and he with these teams played fourteen matches and scored two goals.

Kosovo
In October 2022, it was announced by the Kosovan media that Sadiku has decided to represent Kosovo at the international level. On 11 November 2022, he formalizes the decision and accept their call-up for the friendly matches against Armenia and Faroe Islands. His debut with Kosovo came five days after call-up in a friendly match against Armenia after being named in the starting line-up.

Return to Finland
On 30 December 2022, Sadiku unexpectedly decided to represent Finland again by accepting their call-up from the senior team for the friendly matches against Sweden and Estonia. His debut with Finland came ten days after call-up in the friendly match against Sweden after being named in the starting line-up.

Honours
Individual
Veikkausliiga Breakthrough of the Year: 2022
Veikkausliiga Team of the Year: 2022

References

External links

2003 births
Living people
People from Raahe
Finnish footballers
Finland international footballers
Finland youth international footballers
Finland under-21 international footballers
Kosovan footballers
Kosovo international footballers
Finnish people of Kosovan descent
Dual internationalists (football)
Association football forwards
Kakkonen players
Klubi 04 players
Veikkausliiga players
FC Honka players